Josef "Pepi" Isser is an Austrian luger who competed in the 1950s.  He won two medals at the inaugural event at the FIL World Luge Championships in Oslo in 1955 with a silver in the men's doubles and a bronze in the men's singles events. His silver in the men's doubles was with his sister Maria marked the only time a woman ever won a medal in a men's event at a World Championships, Winter Olympics, or European Championships until the debut of a mixed team event at both the European and World Championships in the late 1980s.

Isser also won four medals at the European luge championships with two golds (Men's singles: 1956, Men's doubles: 1954), one silver (Men's doubles: 1951), and one bronze (Men's bronze: 1952).

In bobsleigh, Isser won three medals at the FIBT World Championships with one silver (Two-man: 1955) and two bronzes (Two-man: 1958, Four-man: 1962).

References

Bobsleigh two-man world championship medalists since 1931
Bobsleigh four-man world championship medalists since 1930
Hickok sports information on World champions in luge and skeleton.

Austrian male bobsledders
Austrian male lugers
Possibly living people
Year of birth missing